The Kyrgyzstan men's national tennis team represents Kyrgyzstan in Davis Cup tennis competition and are governed by the Kyrgyzstan Tennis Federation.

Kyrgyzstan currently compete in the Asia/Oceania Zone of Group IV.

History
Kyrgyzstan competed in its first Davis Cup in 2002.  Their best result was seventh place in Group III in 2003.  Prior to 1993, Kyrgyz players represented the Soviet Union.

Current team (2022) 

 Mirgiiaz Mirdzhaliev
 Ilgiz Kamchibekov (Junior player)
 Evgeniy Babak

See also
Davis Cup
Kyrgyzstan Fed Cup team

External links

Davis Cup teams
Davis Cup
Davis Cup